Vladimir Tintor (born 18 July 1978) is a Serbian film actor. He appeared in more than twelve films since 2002. He is openly gay and living in Zagreb.

Selected filmography

References

External links
 

1978 births
Living people
Actors from Novi Sad
Serbian male film actors
Serbian male television actors
Gay actors
Serbian LGBT people
Serbian expatriates in Croatia